Ilyinskoye is a rural locality (a village) in Argunovskoye Rural Settlement, Nikolsky District, Vologda Oblast, Russia. The population was 246 as of 2002.

Geography 
The distance to Nikolsk is 47 km, to Argunovo is 3 km. Pavlovo is the nearest rural locality.

References 

Rural localities in Nikolsky District, Vologda Oblast